The Norway national cricket team is the team that represents Norway in international cricket matches. The Norwegian Cricket Board became an affiliate member of the International Cricket Council (ICC) in 2000, and the national side played its first international match later that year. Most of the side's matches have been against members of the European Cricket Council (ECC), although in more recent years Norway has fielded sides in the lower divisions of the World Cricket League (WCL). The team's current head coach is Muhammad Haroon, a former first-class player in Pakistan, who was appointed in early 2014. In 2017, they became an associate member.

History
Norwegian cricket was first organised in the 1960s by a few Asian immigrants and has grown to the current state of 55 clubs playing in five divisions.

Norway became a member of the International Cricket Council in 2000  and played in their first international tournament – the European Representative Championships in Austria – in that same year. They won the tournament without losing a game, but did not play again until 2003, when they took part in the ECC Trophy for the first time. They won this tournament too, again without losing a game. This qualified the team for a place in Division Two of the European Championship in 2004. They finished fourth in the six-team tournament, gaining wins against Gibraltar and Israel.

In 2005 Norway won the European Affiliates Championship, the equivalent of the ECC Trophy. They once again won the tournament without losing a game, and again qualified for Division Two of the European Championship in 2006. They won the tournament, beating debutants Jersey in the final after losing to them in the group stage. This gave Norway a place in Division One for the first time in 2008 and earned them a place in Division Five of the World Cricket League. 

In May 2008, Norway travelled to Jersey to take part in the Division Five tournament. Although they beat Vanuatu in Group A, it was the team's only group stage win and with four loses they failed to make the semi-finals. Norway finished ninth overall after defeating the Bahamas and then Japan in positional playoff matches. With only the top two from this tournament qualifying for Division Four in Tanzania later in the year, Norway missed out on the chance to take their 2011 World Cup dream any further.

In July 2008, Norway met the top nations of European cricket when they participated in Division One of the European Championship. The Norwegians finished sixth overall in the six-team tournament, beaten convincingly in four of their matches – against Denmark, Ireland, the Netherlands, and Scotland – whilst their match against Italy was abandoned owing to rain.

In August 2009, Norway travelled to Singapore to compete in Division Six of the World Cricket League. They won only one of five group matches and finished sixth overall after losing a positional playoff to Botswana. As a result, Norway were relegated to Division Seven.

In May 2011, Norway travelled to Botswana for Division Seven of the World Cricket League and their relatively poor performances at ICC events continued as they finished fifth overall, although they did beat Japan in a group match and then a positional playoff. Fifth place saw Norway relegated to Division Eight of the World Cricket League.

However, by the end of year 2011 a drastic change in team performance was observed World Cricket League, mainly due to the inclusion of a number of new, younger, and fitter players. Under the captaincy of Rakesh the team went on to win several qualifying rounds and titles in games against higher or similarly ranked teams, such as Japan. In June 2012, in the World Cricket League, the team gained the top spot in the shortest format of the game, with amazing reformations in the field. This success won Norway a spot in another ICC qualifier event, potentially securing them a place in the T20 World Cup Competition.

In 2013 the team competed in the 2013 ICC European T20 Championship Division One in England where they finished in 8th place, securing wins over Sweden and Gibraltar.

In 2014, Norway started their tour with their first game being against Old Southendian and Southchurch cricket club on 21 June. They lost this T20 match by four runs.

2018-Present
In April 2018, the ICC decided to grant full Twenty20 International (T20I) status to all its members. Therefore, all Twenty20 matches played between Norway and other ICC members after 1 January 2019 will be a full T20I. 

In September 2018, Norway qualified from Group C of the 2018–19 ICC World Twenty20 Europe Qualifier to the Regional Finals of the tournament.

The Norwegians played their first T20I match against Italy on 15 June 2019.

Tournament history

European Championship

1996 to 2002: Did not participate
2004: Division Two 4th place
2006: Division Two Winners
2008: Division One 6th place
2010: Division Two 5th place

World Cricket League

2008: Division Five 9th place
2009: Division Six 6th place
2011: Division Seven 5th place
2012: Division Eight 5th place

European Championship T20

2013: Division One 8th place
2014: Division Two 1st place

Germany Tri-Nation Series

2021: Runners-up

Current squad
The following is a list of the players included in Norway's squad for the finals of the 2018–19 ICC T20 World Cup Europe Qualifier in Jersey in June 2019.

Raza Iqbal
Pratik Agnihotri
Khizer Ahmed (captain)
Waqas Ahmed
Nazakat Ali
Tafseer Ali
Prithvi Bhart
Walid Ghauri
Henry Glanfield
Ansar Iqbal
Javed Maroofkhail
Faizan Mumtaz
Hayatullah Niazi
Abdullah Sheikh
Junaid Sheikh
Ehtsham Ul Haq

Records and Statistics 
International match summary — Norway
 
Last updated 31 July 2022

Twenty20 International 
 Highest team total: 186/6 v Czech Republic, 25 July 2022 at Tikkurila Cricket Ground, Vantaa
 Highest individual score: 70* by Sher Sahak v Guernsey, 29 April 2022 at Desert Springs Cricket Ground, Almería  
 Best individual bowling figures: 5/8, Muhammad Butt v Czech Republic, 25 July 2022 at Tikkurila Cricket Ground, Vantaa

Most T20I runs for Norway

Most T20I wickets for Norway

T20I record versus other nations

Records complete to T20I #1714. Last updated 31 July 2022.

See also 
 List of Norway Twenty20 International cricketers
 Norway women's national cricket team

References

https://en.wikipedia.org/wiki/2015_ICC_World_Cricket_League_Division_Six

External links
 European B Championship 2004

Cricket in Norway
National cricket teams
Cricket
Norway in international cricket